Beginning in the 1970s, with the popularity of J.R.R. Tolkien's The Lord of the Rings series, a variety of independent bookstores specializing in science fiction, fantasy, horror, and related genres (often mystery, comics, games, and/or collectibles), began opening. Among the first were Andromeda Books in Birmingham, England, established in 1971, and Bakka-Phoenix Bookstore in Toronto and A Change of Hobbit in Southern California, both established in 1972.  As independent bookstores suffered during the business shifts of the late 20th and early 21st century, many of these closed. During their heyday, however, they were a key part of science fiction fandom, facilitating not just publishing, distribution, and promotion of books, but public events, social events, and community-building.

List of notable bookstores 
This list is meant to include past and present "brick-and-mortar" bookstores.  Bookstores that were once "brick-and-mortar", but have moved online, should be included.  Bookstores that have only ever been solely online vendors should be listed separately.

 A Change of Hobbit, 1972–1991, in Southern California
 The Other Change of Hobbit, established 1974 in Berkeley, later in El Cerrito (now mail-order only)
 DreamHaven Books, Minneapolis, Minnesota (established 1977)
 Forbidden Planet, New York City and London

Notes

External links 
 "Bookstores Specializing in Science Fiction", Biblio.com (last visited March 31, 2014)
 Independent Genre Bookstores, Worlds Without End (last visited March 31, 2014)

Bookstores
Lists of bookstores